Gladys Esther González (born 30 May 1973) is a political scientist who served as National Deputy and currently as National Senator for Buenos Aires Province for Republican Proposal, within of Cambiemos.

Biography 
González is a native of San Carlos de Bolívar, in the northern center of Buenos Aires. She was a candidate for mayor in 2015 in Avellaneda for the Cambiemos alliance. She has a degree on Political Science from the University of Buenos Aires Faculty of Social Sciences. She served as an advisor and legislative aide on Health and Decentralization at the Buenos Aires City Legislature (2003-2005).

In 2005 she was the Director of Banco Ciudad, a position she held until 2007. She is a member of the Pensar Foundation, Mauricio Macri's think tank under the government of Mauricio Macri as Chief of Government of the City of Buenos Aires, he served as Undersecretary of Citizen Attention.

In 2009, she was elected National Representative on the PRO Union list and re-elected in 2013. She was the head of the governor campaign of Miguel del Sel in Santa Fe (2011), and Campaign Manager of the National REpresentative Federico Pinedo (2011) . In 2009 she married her driver who was then appointed to the ministry as his press advisor. Today is the president of the Buenos Aires Chamber of Deputies.

During her two terms in the National Congress, she was a member of the committees of the Elderly; Family, Woman, Childhood and Adolescence; Maritime, Fluvial, Fishing and Port Interests; Mining; Social Security and Forecasting; Third Age and transportation.

Legislative elections of 2017 
On 22 October 2017, she was elected second Senator by the majority of the Province of Buenos Aires, seconding Esteban Bullrich on the Change List.

References

External links 
 Official Twitter

1973 births
Living people
Argentine political scientists
Members of the Argentine Chamber of Deputies elected in Buenos Aires Province
Women members of the Argentine Chamber of Deputies
Members of the Argentine Senate for Buenos Aires Province
Women members of the Argentine Senate
People from Buenos Aires Province
Republican Proposal politicians
21st-century Argentine politicians
21st-century Argentine women politicians
University of Buenos Aires alumni